Tom Novembre (born Jean Thomas Couture; 8 November 1959) is a French actor and singer. He appeared in more than seventy films since 1985.

Selected filmography

References

External links 

1959 births
Living people
French male film actors